Luychu Urqu (Quechua luychu, taruka, deer, urqu mountain, "deer mountain", Hispanicized spelling Luychu Orjo) is a mountain in the Cusco Region in Peru, about  high. It is situated in the Paucartambo Province, Colquepata District, and in the Quispicanchi Province, Ccatca District. Luychu Urqu lies south of the mountain Hatun Urqu (Jatun Orjo), east of the mountain Raqch'i Raqch'iyuq (Rajchi Rajchiyoc) and north of the mountains Q'illu Unuyuq (Quello Unuyoc) and Sipulturayuq (Sepulturayoc).

References 

Mountains of Peru
Mountains of Cusco Region